Tremayne Anchrum Jr. (born June 24, 1998) is an American football guard for the Los Angeles Rams of the National Football League (NFL). He played college football at Clemson.

High school career
Anchrum played football and basketball at McEachern High School in Powder Springs, Georgia. He committed to Clemson on November 19, 2015, choosing the Tigers over Nebraska and Colorado.

College career
After his senior season at Clemson, Anchrum played in the 2020 Senior Bowl.

Professional career

Anchrum was selected by the Los Angeles Rams in the seventh round (250th overall) of the 2020 NFL Draft.

On September 2, 2021, Anchrum was placed on injured reserve. He was activated on October 12.

On September 20, 2022, Anchrum was placed on injured reserve after suffering a fractured fibula in Week 2.

Personal life
His father Tremayne Anchrum Sr. played basketball for USC from 1992 to 1996.

References

1998 births
Living people
People from Powder Springs, Georgia
Sportspeople from Cobb County, Georgia
Players of American football from Georgia (U.S. state)
American football offensive guards
American football offensive tackles
Clemson Tigers football players
Los Angeles Rams players